Antidorcas is a genus of antelope that includes the living springbok and several fossil species.

Modern Taxonomy 
In 2013, Eva Verena Bärmann (of the University of Cambridge) and colleagues undertook a revision of the phylogeny of the tribe Antilopini on the basis of nuclear and mitochondrial data. They showed that the springbok and the gerenuk (Litocranius walleri) form a clade with saiga (Saiga tatarica) as sister taxon. The study pointed out that the saiga and the springbok could be considerably different from the rest of the antilopines; a 2007 phylogenetic study even suggested that the two form a clade sister to the gerenuk. The cladogram below is based on the 2013 study.

Species 
Antidorcas marsupialis - Springbok
†Antidorcas australis
†Antidorcas bondi
†Antidorcas recki

References

Mammal genera
Mammal genera with one living species
Taxa named by Carl Jakob Sundevall
True antelopes